Thomas O'Shea SM (13 March 1870 – 9 May 1954) was the Roman Catholic Archbishop of Wellington, Metropolitan of New Zealand.

In 1935, he was awarded the King George V Silver Jubilee Medal.

Notes

References
 Ernest Richard Simmons, Brief history of the Catholic Church in New Zealand, Catholic Publications Centre, Auckland, 1978
 Michael O'Meeghan S.M., Steadfast in hope : the story of the Catholic Archdiocese of Wellington 1850–2000, Dunmore press, Palmerston North, 2003.
 Nicholas Reid, James Michael Liston: A Life, Victoria University Press, Wellington, 2006.
 Archbishop Thomas O'Shea SM, Catholic Hierarchy website (retrieved 12 February 2011)

Roman Catholic archbishops of Wellington
20th-century Roman Catholic archbishops in New Zealand
People educated at St. Patrick's College, Wellington
1870 births
1954 deaths
New Zealand people of Irish descent
People from San Francisco
American emigrants to New Zealand
American Roman Catholic archbishops
American expatriate bishops
New Zealand Roman Catholic archbishops